The third season of the American serial drama television series Lost commenced airing in the United States and Canada on October 4, 2006, and concluded on May 23, 2007.  The third season continues the stories of a group of over 40 people who have been stranded on a remote island in the South Pacific, after their airplane crashed 68 days prior to the beginning of the season. In the Lost universe, the season takes place from November 28 to December 21, 2004.  The producers have stated that as the first season is about introducing the survivors and the second season is about the hatch, the third season is about the Others, a group of mysterious island inhabitants.

In response to fan complaints about scheduling in the previous seasons, ABC decided to air the episodes without reruns, albeit in two separate blocks.  In the United States, the first block consisted of six episodes aired on Wednesdays at 9:00 pm and after a twelve-week break, the season continued with the remaining 16 episodes at 10:00 pm.  In addition, three clip-shows recapped previous events on the show.  "Lost: A Tale of Survival" aired a week before the season premiere, "Lost Survivor Guide" aired before the seventh episode and "Lost: The Answers" aired before the season finale. Buena Vista Home Entertainment released the season under the title Lost: The Complete Third Season – The Unexplored Experience on December 11, 2007, in Region 1 on DVD and Blu-ray Disc.

Crew 
The season was produced by Touchstone Television (now ABC Studios), Bad Robot Productions and Grass Skirt Productions and was aired on the American Broadcasting Company network in the United States of America.  The executive producers for the third season were co-creator J. J. Abrams, co-creator Damon Lindelof, Bryan Burk, Jack Bender, Jeff Pinkner and Carlton Cuse.  The staff writers were Lindelof, Cuse, Pinkner, co-executive producers Edward Kitsis & Adam Horowitz, co-executive producer Drew Goddard, supervising producer Elizabeth Sarnoff, story editor Christina M. Kim and executive story editor Brian K. Vaughan.  The regular directors were Bender, supervising producer Stephen Williams, Paul Edwards and Eric Laneuville.  Lindelof and Cuse served as the show runners.

Cast 

The season featured 16 major roles with star billing, making it the second largest ensemble cast of the 2006–2007 television season, behind ABC's Desperate Housewives.  Characters are briefly summarized and credited in alphabetical order.
 Adewale Akinnuoye-Agbaje returns as warlord turned priest Mr. Eko.
 Naveen Andrews acts as Sayid Jarrah, a former Iraqi Republican Guard.   
 Henry Ian Cusick was promoted to the main cast, playing three-year islander Desmond Hume. 
 Emilie de Ravin portrays single new mother Claire Littleton. 
 Michael Emerson as Ben Linus, the manipulative leader of the Others.  
 Matthew Fox stars as doctor Jack Shephard, the leader of the castaways. 
 Jorge Garcia plays unlucky millionaire and comic relief Hugo "Hurley" Reyes. 
 Josh Holloway portrays the sardonic con-man James "Sawyer" Ford. 
 Daniel Dae Kim plays non-English speaking Jin Kwon, the son of a fisherman.
 Yunjin Kim as Jin's English-speaking pregnant wife Sun.  
 Evangeline Lilly stars as fugitive Kate Austen, who is unsure whether she loves Jack or Sawyer more.  
 Elizabeth Mitchell joins the cast as fertility specialist Juliet Burke, an Other trying to escape the Island.  
 Dominic Monaghan plays former rock star Charlie Pace.  
 Terry O'Quinn plays John Locke, an alienated survivor with a deep connection to the island. 
 Kiele Sanchez and Rodrigo Santoro also join as previously unseen crash survivors Nikki and Paulo Fernandez.

The third season featured numerous recurring guest stars. M. C. Gainey plays the Other Tom. Tania Raymonde plays Alex, while Mira Furlan plays her mother Danielle Rousseau, who meets Alex for the first time since she was born. Andrew Divoff acts as the eye-patched Other Mikhail Bakunin and Nestor Carbonell acts as the ageless Other Richard Alpert.  Marsha Thomason plays Naomi Dorrit, who arrives on the Island.  Blake Bashoff plays Alex's boyfriend Karl.  Michael Bowen portrays the vengeful Other Pickett and William Mapother portrays the late Other, Ethan Rom.  Sonya Walger plays Desmond's off-island girlfriend Penny Widmore.  L. Scott Caldwell and Sam Anderson briefly return as Flight 815 married couple Rose Henderson and Bernard Nadler as does Kimberley Joseph as kidnapped 815 flight attendant Cindy.

Special guest stars are actors and actresses who were once given star billing, but due to a character's death or escape from the island, now appear on occasion.  First season main cast member Ian Somerhalder reprised his role in hallucinations and flashbacks as Boone Carlyle, as did his stepsister Shannon Rutherford, played by Maggie Grace.  Malcolm David Kelley returned for a single scene as ten-year-old Walt Lloyd.

Reception

Critical reception 

On Rotten Tomatoes, the season has an approval rating of 71% with an average score of 7.9 out of 10 based on 12 reviews. The website's critical consensus reads, "Lost asks its audience to suspend their disbelief in ways that can be extremely trying for the grounded sci-fi show, but its character-driven plot holds season three together."

The first block of episodes was criticized for raising too many mysteries and not providing enough answers. Complaints were also made about the limited screen-time for many of the main characters in the first block. Locke, played by Terry O'Quinn, who had tied for the highest second-season episode count, appeared in only 14 of the 23 episodes in the third season – only two more than guest star M.C. Gainey, who played Tom. Reaction to two new characters, Nikki and Paulo, was generally negative, with Lindelof even acknowledging that the couple was "universally despised" by fans. The decision to split the season and the American timeslot switch after the hiatus were also criticized. Cuse acknowledged that "No one was happy with the six-episode run."

The second block of episodes was critically acclaimed however, with the crew dealing with problems from the first block. More answers were written into the show and Nikki and Paulo were killed off. It was also announced that the series would end three seasons after the third season, which Cuse hoped would tell the audience that the writers knew where the story was going.

Awards and nominations 
The third season was nominated for six Primetime Emmy Awards. It was nominated for Outstanding Directing for a Drama Series (Jack Bender for "Through the Looking Glass), Outstanding Writing for a Drama Series (Damon Lindelof and Carlton Cuse for "Through the Looking Glass"), Outstanding Supporting Actor in a Drama Series (Michael Emerson), Outstanding Single Camera Picture Editing for a Drama Series, and Outstanding Sound Editing for a Series. Terry O'Quinn won for Outstanding Supporting Actor in a Drama Series.

"Flashes Before Your Eyes", written by Damon Lindelof and Drew Goddard, was nominated for a Writers Guild of America Award in the "Episodic Drama" category. The producers were nominated for a Producers Guild Award in the "TV Drama" category. Lost stunt team was nominated for the season's only Screen Actors Guild Award. Lost third season also received a Television Critics Association nomination in the drama category. The season also received two Directors Guild Award nominations, Eric Laneuville for "The Brig" and Jack Bender for "Through the Looking Glass".

Ratings 
The season averaged 13.74 million American viewers per episode, ranking 17th in viewership and ninth in the key adults 18–49 demographic. The first block had an average close to four million more viewers than the second block, with the 14th episode meeting a ratings low for the series, with 11.52 million viewers. However, Lost was the most recorded program of 2007.

Episodes 

The number in the "No. in series" column refers to the episode's number within the overall series, whereas the number in the "No. in season" column refers to the episode's number within this particular season.  "Featured character(s)" refers to the character(s), whose back story is featured in the episode's flashbacks. "U.S. viewers (million)" refers to the number of viewers in the United States in millions who watched the episode as it was aired.

Home media release

References

External links 

List of Lost season 3 episodes at Lostpedia

Lost (TV series)
2006 American television seasons
2007 American television seasons